Cole Dewhurst (born June 23, 2003) is an American soccer player who plays as a defender for Providence Friars.

Career
Born in Beverly, Massachusetts, Dewhurst is the son of Sarah and former footballer Jason Dewhurst. He has one sister, Chloe Dewhurst who is a high jumper at Springfield College. She was named All-American at the 2022 NCAA Indoor Track National Championship where she placed 6th in the high jump. He began his career at FC Stars before joining the New England Revolution academy in 2016. On April 27, 2020, it was announced that Dewhurst had committed to playing college soccer for the Providence Friars.

In March 2021, it was announced that Dewhurst would be part of the Revolution's reserve side, New England Revolution II, in USL League One. He made his debut with the side on April 10, 2021, in their opening match against Fort Lauderdale CF, Dewhurst coming on as an 82nd-minute substitute in a 1–0 victory.

In the fall of 2021, Dewhurst made the move to Providence College to play college soccer.

Career statistics

References

External links
 Profile at New England Revolution
 Profile at U.S. Soccer Development Academy

2003 births
Living people
People from Lancaster, Massachusetts
Sportspeople from Worcester County, Massachusetts
American soccer players
Association football defenders
New England Revolution II players
USL League One players
Soccer players from Massachusetts
Providence Friars men's soccer players